Mariolina De Fano (14 October 1940 – 18 August 2020) was an Italian actress.

Partial filmography

Il carabiniere (1981) - Maid
Vigili e vigilesse (1982) - Assunta
Pover'ammore (1982)
L'ammiratrice (1983) - Caterina
Where Are You? I'm Here (1993)
Prestazione straordinaria (1994)
The Graduates (1995)
Dove sei perduto amore (1997)
Fireworks (1997) - Barbara Passanisi's Aunt
The Bride's Journey (1997)
Un bugiardo in paradiso (1998)
E insieme vivremo tutte le stagioni (1999)
La bomba (1999)
Tutto l'amore che c'è (2000) - Zia Rosa
Si fa presto a dire amore... (2000) - Madre Silvana
E adesso sesso (2001)
Soul Mate (2002) - Benedetta
Un mondo d'amore (2002)
All'alba saliremo il monte (2002)
Love Returns (2004)
Nicola, li dove sorge il sole (2006)
The Cézanne Affair (2009) - Signorina Lo Turco
Piripiccho - L'ultima mossa (2010)
Senza arte né parte (2011) - Mamma Carmine
Non me lo dire (2012)
Pane e burlesque (2014)
Noi siamo Francesco (2014) - La tata
Chi m'ha visto (2017) - Natuzza (final film role)

References

External links
 

1940 births
2020 deaths
People from Bari
Italian film actresses
Italian stage actresses
Italian television actresses
20th-century Italian actresses
21st-century Italian actresses